The 2002–03 Argentine Primera División was the 112th season of top-flight football in Argentina. The season ran from 26 July 2002 to 6 July 2003.  Olimpo (Bahía Blanca) (champion of 2001–02 Primera B Nacional, making its debut in Primera) and Arsenal (winner of "Torneo Reducido" after beating Gimnasia y Esgrima de Concepción del Uruguay in a two-legged series) were promoted from Primera B Nacional.

Independiente won the Apertura (16th. title) while River Plate won the Clausura (33rd. title). On the other hand, Talleres de Córdoba and Nueva Chicago played the promotion playoff v San Martín de Mendoza and Argentinos Juniors respectively, in order to define which team would remain in (or promote to) Primera División. As teams in Primea División beat their rivals, teams relegated were Unión de Santa Fe and Huracán).

Torneo Apertura

Final standings

Top scorers

Torneo Clausura

Final standings

Top scorers

Tournament review 
River Plate, Boca Juniors and Velez Sarsfield were the teams who kept the league's lead for most of the tournament (except for Round 4, when the temporary leader was Rosario Central, who finished fourth), and those three teams were the ones who arrived at the last rounds with possibilities of winning the tournament.

Velez Sarsfield started the tournament with three wins in a row, obtaining the lead at the end of Round 3. Boca Juniors went on a winning streak from rounds 3 to 7, winning five consecutive games, taking the lead at the end of Round 5.

On May 4, 2003, during Round 11, Velez Sarsfield got a home win against leaders Boca Juniors and after three more consecutive wins, regained the top position in the league.

On June 1, during Round 14, Boca Juniors and River Plate confronted each other in the Superclásico at Boca Juniors stadium. The game ended 2-2 and allowed Velez, who won their match, to be the sole leaders of the league.

However, an unexpected home loss to Olimpo on Round 15, made Velez lose the first position as Boca and River won their matches against Huracán and San Lorenzo respectively. At the end of the matchday, Boca Juniors were the new leaders.

On June 15, during Round 16, River Plate defeated Lanús and because Velez and Boca tied their games, finished the match day as sole leaders.

On June 29, during Round 18, River defeated Olimpo in Bahía Blanca and won the championship, by getting a difference of 4 points to rivals Boca Juniors, with only 1 round to go.

This table shows the evolution of the league table, showing team result, overall points and position on the table at the end of each round for the three teams that fought for the championship until the last rounds.

Relegation

Relegation table

Promotion Playoffs 

 Nueva Chicago and Talleres (C) remained in Primera División.

See also
2002-03 in Argentine football

References

Argentine Primera División seasons
2002–03 in Argentine football leagues